These are the official results of the Men's 4x400 metres event at the 1991 IAAF World Championships in Tokyo, Japan. There were a total number of sixteen participating nations, with three qualifying heats and the final held on Sunday September 1, 1991. The final was won by Great Britain in what was, at the time, the fourth fastest time in history (behind the USA team's 1988 World Record, and two other US times). Going into the meeting, the USA 4 × 400 m team hadn't lost at a major championships in over 7 years. Britain, by contrast, hadn't won a gold medal in the event since the 1936 Berlin Olympics.

The British team made a tactical change, switching their top runner Roger Black, expected to be the anchor leg runner, to the first leg.  The move paid off.  Black ran a 44.6 first leg, catching Andrew Valmon before the handoff. giving Derek Redmond the edge to beat Quincy Watts to the break.  Both Watts and Redmond would become famous the following year, Watts for winning the Olympic gold medal in the 400 metres and Redmond for his determination, finishing his semi-final race in that same event with a torn hamstring, assisted by his father.  Watts ran a 44.1 leg to catch Redmond, but it could have been faster because Watts had to pass Redmond on the outside of the turn due to the British team's superior position.  Danny Everett was not able to put any distance on John Regis, even having to fend off a challenge on the final straightaway, so going into the final leg, the USA held only a small lead. Kriss Akabusi, running the anchor leg paced off of the individual 400m Champion, Antonio Pettigrew, then dramatically overtook him on the home straight to win. The USA team were so shocked by the result, that even on the medal podium, they were still in disbelief at the result. Indeed, television footage immediately after the race, showed Pettigrew stood, hands on hips, shaking his head at the outcome of the race. The result was the only time out of 8 major championships over a 12-year span that the US team failed to win gold.

Schedule
All times are Japan Standard Time (UTC+9)

Final

Qualifying heats
Held on Saturday 1991-08-31

See also
 1988 Men's Olympic 4 × 400 m Relay (Seoul)
 1990 Men's European Championships 4 × 400 m Relay (Split)
 1992 Men's Olympic 4 × 400 m Relay (Barcelona)
 1993 Men's World Championships 4 × 400 m Relay (Stuttgart)

Notes
In 2002 this race came 42nd in the TV programme 100 Greatest Sporting Moments by Channel 4 of the UK.

References
 Results

 
Relays at the World Athletics Championships